Lakewood is a city in Pierce County, Washington, United States. The population was 63,612 at the 2020 census.

History
Lakewood was officially incorporated on February 28, 1996. Historical names include Tacoma/Lakewood Center and Lakes District (this name was used by the U.S. Census in the 1970 and 1980 Census). Lakewood is the second-largest city in Pierce County and is home to the Clover Park School District, the Lakewood Water District, Fort Steilacoom Park and Western State Hospital, a regional state psychiatric hospital.

Thornewood Castle was built in the vicinity of Tacoma in the area that is now Lakewood.

Geography
Lakewood is located at  (47.164, -122.526).

There are several lakes within the city limits; the largest in area are American Lake, Lake Steilacoom, Gravelly Lake, Lake Louise, and Waughop Lake. The Waughop Lake is incorporated into the aforementioned Fort Steilacoom Park. A number of small creeks flow through Lakewood, some of which drain into nearby Puget Sound. The largest of these, Chambers Creek, flows from Lake Steilacoom to Chambers Bay between nearby University Place and Steilacoom.

The western terminus of State Route 512 is in Lakewood, at its intersection with Interstate 5.  The proposed State Route 704 would be the only other state highway entering the city.

Demographics

2010 census
As of the census of 2010, there were 58,163 people, 24,069 households, and 14,412 families living in the city. The racial makeup of the city was 59.3% White, 11.8% African American, 1.3% Native American, 9.0% Asian, 2.6% Pacific Islander, 7.3% from other races, and 8.7% from two or more races. Hispanic or Latino of any race were 15.3% of the population.

There were 24,069 households, of which 29.8% had children under the age of 18 living with them, 39.3% were married couples living together, 15.1% had a female householder with no husband present, 5.5% had a male householder with no wife present, and 40.1% were non-families. 32.3% of all households were made up of individuals, and 9.5% had someone living alone who was 65 years of age or older. The average household size was 2.36 and the average family size was 2.98.

The median age in the city was 36.6 years. 22.7% of residents were under the age of 18; 10.9% were between the ages of 18 and 24; 26.4% were from 25 to 44; 26.5% were from 45 to 64; and 13.6% were 65 years of age or older. The gender makeup of the city was 49.0% male and 51.0% female.

2000 census
As of the census of 2000, there were 58,211 people, 23,792 households, and 15,084 families living in the city. The population density was 3,401.3 people per square mile (1,313.6/km2). There were 25,396 housing units at an average density of 1,483.9 per square mile (573.1/km2). The racial makeup of the city was 64.82% White, 12.25% African American, 8.95% Asian, 1.84% Pacific Islander, 1.55% Native American, 3.55% from other races, and 7.04% from two or more races. Hispanic or Latino of any race were 8.49% of the population.

There were 23,792 households, out of which 30.1% had children under the age of 18 living with them, 44.4% were married couples living together, 14.5% had a female householder with no husband present, and 36.6% were non-families. 29.6% of all households were made up of individuals, and 8.7% had someone living alone who was 65 years of age or older. The average household size was 2.38 and the average family size was 2.94.

The population was spread out, with 24.4% under the age of 18, 11.3% from 18 to 24, 29.4% from 25 to 44, 21.6% from 45 to 64, and 13.2% who were 65 years of age or older. The median age was 35 years. For every 100 females, there were 95.8 males. For every 100 females aged 18 and over, there were 93.9 males.

The median income for a household in the city was $36,422, and the median income for a family was $42,551. Males had a median income of $31,434 versus $26,653 for females. The per capita income for the city was $20,569. About 12.5% of families and 15.8% of the population were below the poverty line, including 23.5% of those under age 18 and 5.6% of those age 65 or over.

Government and politics

Police
The City of Lakewood contracted with the Pierce County Sheriff's Office for police services between 1996 and 2004. According to the City of Lakewood website, the Lakewood Police Department started independent police and patrol operations on November 1, 2004.

Firefighters 
Lakewood is served by the West Pierce Fire Department (WPFD). The WPFD also serves University Place. The WPFD has 6 departments located in the two cities.

2009 shooting

On November 29, 2009, four LPD officers were shot and killed. Maurice Clemmons walked into the Parkland Forza Coffee shop at around 8:15 a.m. After approaching the counter, he turned and started shooting. Dead at the scene were Sergeant Mark Renninger, 39, and officers Tina Griswold, 40, Ronald Owens, 37, and Greg Richards, 42. Each of them had served with the department since its inception. Two baristas and several customers in the shop were not injured.  Clemmons was shot and killed by a Seattle police officer two days later.

The shooting is believed to be the most deadly attack on law enforcement in the state of Washington, and the second deadliest attack on law enforcement in the United States (the Dallas attack on July 7, 2016 had 5 officers killed and 2 wounded) since the March 21, 2009 shootings that left four Oakland, California police officers dead. The four were the first Lakewood police officers to be killed in the line of duty since the department's establishment in 2004.

Twin towns and sister cities 
Lakewood is a sister city of Gimhae, South Korea.

Education
The Clover Park School District, which includes most of the city limits, operates all public schools within Lakewood. Private schools include St Frances Cabrini School, St Mary's Christian School, and Lakewood Lutheran School.

Lakewood is also home to Pierce College Fort Steilacoom and Clover Park Technical College.

Portions of Lakewood are in the Steilacoom Historical School District and Tacoma Public Schools.

Economy
Lakewood's economy is highly dependent upon on the military bases in the area. It also boasts one of the few true International Districts in the South Sound along South Tacoma Way and Pacific Highway, with Korean, Vietnamese, Chinese, Latino and other influences (the population of Lakewood's Tillicum neighborhood is nearly half non-English speaking). Many apartment complexes in Lakewood

Media
Lakewood's news is primarily covered by The News Tribune (Tacoma), and sometimes by the media in Seattle.  Earlier weekly newspapers for the community were the Lakewood Log (circa 1930s), Suburban Times (1960s-1982), Lakewood Press (1980s), and Lakewood Journal (1990s).

KLAY-AM radio provides Lakewood-specific talk radio. KVTI-FM, known as "I-91 FM", broadcast top 40 music from its Lakewood studio at Clover Park Technical College until 2010, when the college transferred management of the station to Washington State University's Northwest Public Radio who discontinued the locally produced programming in favor of a network feed from the University's Pullman campus.  The Clover Park School District operated KCPQ (thus the call letters) until 1980, when the district sold the station to Kelly Broadcasting.

Lakewood receives Seattle area television and radio stations.

Notable people
 Zach Banner, professional American football player 
 Llewellyn Chilson, U.S. Army soldier
 Edgar N. Eisenhower, attorney and brother of U.S. president Dwight D. Eisenhower
 William Hardin Harrison, U.S. Army General and first mayor of Lakewood
 Adre-Anna Jackson, unsolved death
 Jermaine Kearse, professional American football player
 Craig Lancaster, novelist
 James S. Russell, U.S. Navy Admiral
 Emeka Egbuka, Ohio State wide receiver

Points of interest
 Fort Steilacoom
 Lakewold Gardens
 Lakewood Towne Center
 Lakewood Playhouse
 Thornewood
 Western State Hospital

Recognition
Lakewood and Pierce County were named among the 100 Best Places for Young People by America's Promise.

Notes

External links

 City of Lakewood official site
 

 
Cities in the Seattle metropolitan area
Cities in Washington (state)
Former census-designated places in Washington (state)
Cities in Pierce County, Washington
Populated places established in 1833
1833 establishments in the British Empire